is a former municipality in Nordland county, Norway.  The  municipality existed from 1924 until its dissolution in 1964.  The municipality included the northern part of the island of Andøya as well as many small surrounding islets and skerries in what is now Andøy Municipality.  The administrative centre was the village of Andenes where the Andenes Church is located.

History
The municipality of Andenes was established on 1 January 1924 when Dverberg Municipality was divided into three: Andenes (population: 2,213) in the north, Bjørnskinn (population: 1,410) in the south, and Dverberg (population: 1,477) in the central part of the old municipality.  During the 1960s, there were many municipal mergers across Norway due to the work of the Schei Committee.  On 1 January 1964, the municipality of Andenes (population: 3,812) was merged (back) with the municipalities of Dverberg (population: 1,719) and Bjørnskinn (population: 1,835) to create the new Andøy Municipality.

Name
The Old Norse form of the name was Andarnes (from originally Amdarnes). The first element is the genitive case of Ömd (the old name of the island Andøya) and the last element is nes which means "headland".

Government

The municipal council  of Andenes was made up of representatives that were elected to four year terms.  The party breakdown of the final municipal council was as follows:

See also
List of former municipalities of Norway

References

Andøy
Former municipalities of Norway
1924 establishments in Norway
1964 disestablishments in Norway